In heraldry, the royal badges of England comprise the heraldic badges that were used by the monarchs of the Kingdom of England.

Heraldic badges are distinctive to a person or family, similar to the arms and the crest. But unlike them, the badge is not an integral component of a coat of arms, although they can be displayed alongside them. Badges are in fact complete and independent and can be displayed alone. Furthermore, unlike the arms and crest, which are personal devices that could only be displayed by the owner, the badge could be easily borne by others, in the form of a cognizance or livery badge, to be worn by retainers and adherents. Badges are displayed on standards and personal objects, as well as on private and public buildings to show ownership or patronage.

History

Royal badges have been in use since the earliest stages of English heraldry. They are invariably simple devices, and numerous examples were adopted and inherited by various sovereigns. These are found in the glass and fabric of royal palaces and memorial chapels, and sometimes in the houses of those who enjoyed or anticipated royal patronage.

The earliest royal heraldic badge is a sprig of common broom, said to have been worn by Geoffrey of Anjou in his cap. The broom plant or Plantegenest (planta genista in medieval Latin), thus became Geoffrey's nickname; "Plantagenet". The heraldic device also became the name of the dynasty that was borne from him, which was to rule England for over 300 years. The Plantagenet kings would use this badge, sometimes combining it with other more personal devices. King Henry II used the 'planta genista' as well as an escarbuncle. King Richard I used a star and crescent device, which was also adopted by his brother King John. King Henry III adopted the broom sprig and the star and crescent. His son Edward I in addition to these, added the golden rose device that he inherited from his mother Eleanor of Provence. King Edward II further added the golden castle of Castile, inherited from his mother Eleanor of Castile.

It was actually Richard of York, 3rd Duke of York who adopted the Plantagenet name for him and his descendants in the 15th century. It is obscure why Richard chose the name but it emphasised Richard's hierarchal status as Geoffrey's, and six English kings', patrilineal descendant during the Wars of the Roses. The retrospective usage of the name for all Geoffrey's male descendants became popular in Tudor times probably encouraged by the added legitimacy it gave Richard's great-grandson, King Henry VIII of England.

Badges came into general use by the reign of King Edward III. The king himself deployed many badges alluding to his lineage, as well as new personal devices.

List of royal badges

References
Citations

Bibliography

See also

 Heraldic badge
 Royal Standards of England
 Royal Supporters of England
 Queen's Beasts
 Royal Arms of England
 Prince of Wales's feathers

 
National symbols of England
England
English heraldry